The Clubes Island (Portuguese: Ilha dos Clubes) is the smallest of the three islands of Lake Paranoá in Brasília, Distrito Federal, Brazil. It is approximately 6m² in surface, is located close to the Juscelino Kubitschek Bridge. The other two islands are Paranoá Island and Retiro Island.

Lake islands of Brazil